Hesperus Mountain is the highest summit of the La Plata Mountains range of the Rocky Mountains of North America. The summit of Hesperus Mountain is the highest point in Montezuma County.

Mountain

Hesperus is notable as the Navajo People's Sacred Mountain of the North, which marks the northern boundary of the Dinetah, their traditional homeland. It is associated with the color black, and is said to be impregnated with jet. When First Man created the mountain as a replica of mountains in the Fourth World, he fastened it to the ground with a rainbow and covered it in darkness.

The San Juan Mountains have been the traditional homeland of the Ute People.  http://www.dargnet.org
http://uintahbasintah.org/maps/ubsw.jpg

Along with Ute the La Plata Mountain Range has also been the early homeland of the Navajo People who had settled on and near this mountain and the La Plata Mountain Range.

See also
List of mountain peaks of Colorado
List of Colorado county high points

References

External links

Hesperus Mountain on Hikearizona.com

Mountains of Montezuma County, Colorado
San Juan Mountains (Colorado)
San Juan National Forest
North American 4000 m summits
Sacred mountains
Religious places of the indigenous peoples of North America
Mountains of Colorado